Garra tamangi is a species of ray-finned fish in the genus Garra described from the Dikrong River (a tributary of the Brahmaputra River basin) at Hoj near NHPC complex, Itanagar, Papum Pare district, Arunachal  Pradesh, north eastern India.

Description

Garra tamangi can be distinguished from its congeners by having roughly- a triangular proboscis trilobed with two small lobes anteriorly free and a large median lobe anteroventrally tuberculated. Di-,tri-and tetracuspid tubercles on snout.

Etymology

The species is named after Lakpa Tamang in recognition of his assistance to the authors during the field work in Arunachal Pradesh.

References 

Garra
Taxa named by Shantabala Devi Gurumayum
Taxa named by Laishram Kosygin
Fish described in 2016